This is a list of commercial banks in Niger

 Bank of Africa Niger
 Banque Atlantique Niger	
 Banque Régionale de Solidarité Niger	
 Banque Sahélo-Saharienne pour l'Investissement et le Commerce (BSSIC)	
 Ecobank Niger	
 Crédit du Niger	
 Banque Internationale pour l'Afrique au Niger	
 Banque Commerciale du Niger	
 Banque Islamique du Niger pour le Commerce et l'Investissement	
 Société Nigérienne de Banque

See also

 List of banks in Africa
 Central Bank of West African States
 Economy of Niger

References

External links
 Website of Central Bank of West African States (English)

 
Banks
Niger
Niger